John McGlashan (3 June 1967 – 10 January 2018) was a Scottish football player and manager.

Playing career
In a long professional career, he played for nine clubs. He started his senior career in 1988 with Montrose, scoring some goals from a midfield position. This earned him a £50,000 move to London club Millwall in 1990. After loan spells with Fulham and Cambridge United, McGlashan moved to Peterborough United for £75,000 in 1993. A year later McGlashan moved to Rotherham United, where he stayed for three years. Whilst at Rotherham he was a part of the team that won the 1996 Football League Trophy Final. McGlashan returned to Scottish football in the summer of 1997, signing for Dundee. He made 11 appearances and scored two goals as Dundee won promotion to the Scottish Premier League in his first season with the club. Manager Jocky Scott made many changes to the squad after the club was promoted, and McGlashan was loaned to Arbroath and then moved to Ross County. He returned to Arbroath on a permanent basis in August 2000, and he made over 100 appearances in five years there.

Coaching career
McGlashan had a spell as manager of Millwall Lionesses during his time in London.

In the summer of 2005, McGlashan returned to Dundee Violet as player/manager. His father, also John, had been captain of Dundee Violet. In September 2005, Harry Cairney resigned as Arbroath manager and McGlashan was appointed as his replacement. The following month McGlashan made himself his first signing, re–registering as a player despite missing most of the previous season with a back injury. He made a further two league appearances for the club, over the next two seasons. He managed Arbroath for four years before resigning in October 2009.

McGlashan later managed Tayport and Dundee Violet.

McGlashan died on 10 January 2018 after a battle with Motor Neurone Disease.

References

1967 births
2018 deaths
Footballers from Dundee
Scottish footballers
Montrose F.C. players
Millwall F.C. players
Fulham F.C. players
Cambridge United F.C. players
Peterborough United F.C. players
Rotherham United F.C. players
Dundee F.C. players
Arbroath F.C. players
Ross County F.C. players
English Football League players
Scottish Football League players
Scottish football managers
Arbroath F.C. managers
Dundee Violet F.C. players
Scottish Football League managers
Association football midfielders